Oakman is a town in Walker County, Alabama, United States. At the 2010 census the population was 789, down from 944 in 2000. Initially named Day (or Day's) Gap, it was renamed Oakman and incorporated in 1895.

Geography
Oakman is located at  (33.713594, -87.386111).

It is the only town in Alabama with perfectly round city limits.

Demographics

Oakman first appeared on the 1890 census as the town of Day (or Day's) Gap. It changed its name in 1894 to Oakman and has remained since.

As of the census of 2000, there were 944 people, 386 households, and 265 families residing in the town. The racial makeup of the town was 79.66% White, 19.60% Black or African American, and 0.74% from two or more races. 0.74% of the population were Hispanic or Latino of any race.

There were 386 households, out of which 34.2% had children under the age of 18 living with them, 46.9% were married couples living together, 16.1% had a female householder with no husband present, and 31.3% were non-families. 28.0% of all households were made up of individuals, and 15.3% had someone living alone who was 65 years of age or older. The average household size was 2.45 and the average family size was 3.02.

In the town, the population was spread out, with 28.9% under the age of 18, 6.9% from 18 to 24, 27.3% from 25 to 44, 23.6% from 45 to 64, and 13.2% who were 65 years of age or older. The median age was 36 years. For every 100 females, there were 93.0 males. For every 100 females age 18 and over, there were 87.4 males.

The median income for a household in the town was $22,014, and the median income for a family was $31,964. Males had a median income of $25,221 versus $17,321 for females. The per capita income for the town was $11,936. About 17.4% of families and 20.2% of the population were below the poverty line, including 22.6% of those under age 18 and 26.1% of those age 65 or over.

Education
Oakman High School serves 301 students in grades 9-12. Its mascot is the Wildcats, and the school colors are blue and white. It is a member of the Walker County Board of Education.  In addition, approximately 500 students in grades Pre-K through 8 attend Oakman Elementary/Middle School.

Sports
In 2003 the Wildcats' varsity football team was the 2A Region 4 Champions, had an undefeated record in the regular season, and went to the 2nd round of State Playoffs. In 2005 they went to the 1st round of State Playoffs. In 2007 the Girls Softball Team won the 2A State Championship.
In 1983 the Wildcats varsity football 1A team beat Oakgrove the 2A state champs that year.

References

External links

Towns in Walker County, Alabama
Towns in Alabama
Birmingham metropolitan area, Alabama